In music, 53 equal temperament, called 53 TET, 53 EDO, or 53 ET, is the tempered scale derived by dividing the octave into 53 equal steps (equal frequency ratios).  Each step represents a frequency ratio of 2, or 22.6415 cents, an interval sometimes called the Holdrian comma.

53-TET is a tuning of equal temperament in which the tempered perfect fifth is 701.89 cents wide, as shown in Figure 1.

These are both 5 limit intervals, involving only the primes 2, 3 and 5 in their factorization, and the fact that 53 ET tempers out both characterizes it completely as a 5 limit temperament: it is the only regular temperament tempering out both of these intervals, or commas, a fact which seems to have first been recognized by Japanese music theorist Shohé Tanaka. Because it tempers these out, 53-TET can be used for both schismatic temperament, tempering out the schisma, and Hanson temperament (also called kleismic), tempering out the kleisma.

History and use 

Theoretical interest in this division goes back to antiquity. Jing Fang (78–37 BCE), a Chinese music theorist, observed that a series of 53 just fifths ([]53) is very nearly equal to 31 octaves (231). He calculated this difference with six-digit accuracy to be . Later the same observation was made by the mathematician and music theorist Nicholas Mercator (c. 1620–1687), who calculated this value precisely as  = , which is known as Mercator's comma. Mercator's comma is of such small value to begin with (≈ 3.615 cents), but 53 equal temperament flattens each fifth by only  of that comma (≈ 0.0682 cent ≈  syntonic comma ≈  pythagorean comma). Thus, 53 tone equal temperament is for all practical purposes equivalent to an extended Pythagorean tuning.

After Mercator, William Holder published a treatise in 1694 which pointed out that 53 equal temperament also very closely approximates the just major third (to within 1.4 cents), and consequently 53 equal temperament accommodates the intervals of 5 limit just intonation very well. This property of 53-TET may have been known earlier; Isaac Newton's unpublished manuscripts suggest that he had been aware of it as early as 1664–1665.

Music 
In the 19th century, people began devising instruments in 53-TET, with an eye to their use in playing near-just 5-limit music. Such instruments were devised by RHM Bosanquet and the American tuner James Paul White. Subsequently, the temperament has seen occasional use by composers in the west, and by the early 20th century, 53-TET had become the most common form of tuning in Ottoman classical music, replacing its older, unequal tuning. Arabic music, which for the most part bases its theory on quartertones, has also made some use of it; the Syrian violinist and music theorist Twfiq Al-Sabagh proposed that instead of an equal division of the octave into 24 parts a 24 note scale in 53-TET should be used as the master scale for Arabic music.

Croatian composer Josip Štolcer-Slavenski wrote one piece, which has never been published, which uses Bosanquet's Enharmonium during its first movement, entitled Music for Natur-ton-system.
Furthermore, General Thompson worked in league with the London-based guitar maker Louis Panormo to produce the Enharmonic Guitar (see: James Westbrook,‘General Thompson’s Enharmonic Guitar’, Soundboard: XXXVIII: 4, pp. 45–52.).

Notation

Attempting to use standard notation, seven letter notes plus sharps or flats, can quickly become confusing. This is unlike the case with 19-TET and 31-TET where there is little ambiguity. By not being meantone, it adds some problems that require more attention. Specifically, the major third is different from a ditone, two tones, each of which is two fifths minus an octave. Likewise, the minor third is different from a semiditone. The fact that the syntonic comma is not tempered out means that notes and intervals need to be defined more precisely. Ottoman classical music uses a notation of flats and sharps for the 9-comma tone.

In this article, diatonic notation will be used creating the following chromatic scale, where sharps and flats aren't enharmonic, only E and B are enharmonic with F and C. For the other notes, triple and quadruple sharps and flats aren't enharmonic.

C, C, C, C, C, D, D, D, D,

D, D, D, D, D, E, E, E, E,

E, E, E/F, F,

F, F, F, F, F, G, G, G, G,

G, G, G, G, G, A, A, A, A,

A, A, A, A, A, B, B, B, B,

B, B, B/C, C, C

Another possible notation, based on Pythagorean fifths:

C, B, A, E, D, C, B, F, E,

D, C, B, F, E, D, C, G, F,

E, D, C/A, G,

F, E, D, A, G, F, E, D/B, A,

G, F, E, B, A, G, F, C, B,

A, G, F/D, C, B, A, G, D, C,

B, A, G/E, D, C

Chords of 53 equal temperament
Since 53-TET is a Pythagorean system, with nearly pure fifths, major and minor triads cannot be spelled in the same manner as in a meantone tuning. Instead, the major triads are chords like C-F-G (using the Pythagorean-based notation), where the major third is a diminished fourth; this is the defining characteristic of schismatic temperament. Likewise, the minor triads are chords like C-D-G. In 53-TET, the dominant seventh chord would be spelled C-F-G-B, but the otonal tetrad is C-F-G-C, and C-F-G-A is still another seventh chord. The utonal tetrad, the inversion of the otonal tetrad, is spelled C-D-G-G.

Further septimal chords are the diminished triad, having the two forms C-D-G and C-F-G, the subminor triad, C-F-G, the supermajor triad C-D-G, and corresponding tetrads C-F-G-B and C-D-G-A. Since 53-TET tempers out the septimal kleisma, the septimal kleisma augmented triad C-F-B in its various inversions is also a chord of the system. So is the Orwell tetrad, C-F-D-G in its various inversions.

Because 53-TET is compatible with both the schismatic temperament and the syntonic temperament, it can be used as a pivot tuning in a temperament modulation (a musical effect enabled by dynamic tonality).

Interval size 
Because a distance of 31 steps in this scale is almost precisely equal to a just perfect fifth, in theory this scale can be considered a slightly tempered form of Pythagorean tuning that has been extended to 53 tones. As such the intervals available can have the same properties as any Pythagorean tuning, such as fifths that are (practically) pure, major thirds that are wide from just (about  opposed to the purer , and minor thirds that are conversely narrow ( compared to ).

However, 53-TET contains additional intervals that are very close to just intonation. For instance, the interval of 17 steps is also a major third, but only 1.4 cents narrower than the very pure just interval . 53-TET is very good as an approximation to any interval in 5 limit just intonation. Similarly, the pure just interval  is only 1.3 cents wider than 14 steps in 53-TET.

The matches to the just intervals involving the 7th harmonic are slightly less close (43 steps are 4.8 cents sharp for ), but all such intervals are still quite closely matched with the highest deviation being the  tritone. The 11th harmonic and intervals involving it are less closely matched, as illustrated by the undecimal neutral seconds and thirds in the table below. 7-limit ratios are colored light gray, and 11- and 13-limit ratios are colored dark gray.

Scale diagram

The following are 21 of the 53 notes in the chromatic scale. The rest can easily be added.

Holdrian comma 

The name comma is misleading, since this interval is an irrational number and does not describe the compromise between intervals of any tuning system; it assumes this name because it is an approximation of the syntonic comma (21.51 cents)(), which was widely used as a measurement of tuning in William Holder's time.

The origin of Holder's comma resides in the fact that the Ancient Greeks (or at least Boethius) believed that in the Pythagorean tuning the tone could be divided in nine commas, four of which forming the diatonic semitone and five the chromatic semitone. If all these commas are exactly of the same size, there results an octave of 5 tones + 2 diatonic semitones, 5 × 9 + 2 × 4 = 53 equal commas. Holder attributes the division of the octave in 53 equal parts to Nicholas Mercator, who would have named the 1/53 part of the octave the "artificial comma".

Mercator's comma and the Holdrian comma  
Mercator's comma is a name often used for a closely related interval because of its association with Nicholas Mercator. One of these intervals was first described by Ching-Fang in 45 BCE. Mercator applied logarithms to determine that  (≈ 21.8182 cents) was nearly equivalent to a syntonic comma of ≈ 21.5063 cents (a feature of the prevalent meantone temperament of the time). He also considered that an "artificial comma" of  might be useful, because 31 octaves could be practically approximated by a cycle of 53 just fifths. William Holder, for whom the Holdrian comma is named, favored this latter unit because the intervals of 53 equal temperament are closer to just intonation than that of 55.  Thus Mercator's comma and the Holdrian comma are two distinct but related intervals.

Use in Ottoman music
The Holdrian comma has been employed mainly in Turkish music theory by Kemal Ilerici, and by the Turkish composer Erol Sayan. The name of this comma is Holder koması in Turkish.

For instance, the Rast makam (similar to the Western major scale, or more precisely to the justly-tuned major scale) may be considered in terms of Holdrian commas:

, where  denotes a Holdrian comma flat,

while in contrast, the Nihavend makam (similar to the Western minor scale):

, where  denotes a five-comma flat,

has medium seconds between d–e, e–f, g–a, a–b, and b–c', a medium second being somewhere in between 8 and 9 commas.

Notes
 In common Arabic and Turkish practice, the third note e and the seventh note b in Rast are even lower than in this theory, almost exactly halfway between western major and minor thirds above c and g, i.e. closer to 6.5 commas (three-quarter tone) above d or a and 6.5 below f or c, the thirds c–e and g–b often referred to as a "neutral thirds" by musicologists.

References 

Holder, William, A Treatise on the Natural Grounds, and Principles of Harmony, facsimile of the 1694 edition, Broude Brothers, New York, 1967. (Original pp. 103–106.)

External links
 

 

  Tonal Functions as 53-TET grades.

 

 

Equal temperaments
Microtonality
Commas (music)

fr:Tempérament par division multiple